Multipoint may refer to:

 Multi-point fuel injection, an injection scheme for metering fuel into an internal combustion engine
 Multipoint (geography), a point on the Earth that touches the border of several distinct territories
 Multipoint ground, a type of electrical installation which involves the creation of many alternate paths for electrical energy to find its way back to ground
 Multipoint videoconferencing, simultaneous videoconferencing among three or more remote points by means of a Multipoint Control Unit (MCU)
 Windows MultiPoint Mouse SDK, a Microsoft technology which enables multiple users to share a single PC using multiple mice
 Windows MultiPoint Server, a Microsoft operating system which enables a multiseat configuration
 Bluetooth Multipoint and Advanced Multipoint, a standard for connecting a Bluetooth headset to two (and sometimes more) devices at the same time.
 MultiPoint class in the Simple Features standard representing a collection of geographic points

See also 
Multi-touch